The Scotts Shopping Centre was a shopping mall in Singapore, located along Scotts Road in the Orchard Road vicinity. The mall was branded as a high-end boutique mall with outlets like Pois, Blush, Crème, and Kiehl's, with professional women as its target demographic.

History
Opened in 1982, The mall occupied the first five floors with 8,632 m² of net lettable area of No. 6 Scotts Road. Above the mall was a 23-storey, 153-unit serviced apartment complex known as The Ascott, which was previously owned by The Ascott Group. This branding was a result of a makeover in 1985, prior to which it catered chiefly to the needs of wealthy Indonesian tourists. Also in 1985, the first air-conditioned food court in Singapore, Picnic Food Court, was opened.

In 2004, The Ascott Group sold the entire building to Wheelock Properties (Singapore) (then known as Marco Polo Developments) for S$345 million. but continued to manage the serviced apartments till 31 December 2006.

The shopping mall, previously under the management of CapitaLand Retail, was transferred to Wheelock Properties.

Demolition
In 2006, Wheelock Properties announced plans to demolish the entire building and redevelop it as a luxury residential development of 43-floors, of which three floors would be devoted to an upmarket shopping mall. The mall was demolished on the following year in 2007.

Development on the new building, known as Scotts Square, began in 2007 and was completed in 2011.

References

Demolished buildings and structures in Singapore
Shopping malls in Singapore
Orchard, Singapore
Orchard Road
1982 establishments in Singapore
2007 disestablishments in Singapore
Defunct shopping malls